Omer Vered (born 25 January 1990) is an Israeli retired footballer.

Career
Vered grew up in the Maccabi Tel Aviv youth academy. In 2009, Maccabi loaned him out to Israeli second division side, Ness Ziona. For the 2010/11 season he was loaned out to Israeli Premier League club, Hapoel Haifa, where he made his Premier League debut on 21 August 2010. He started 30 matches and scored 1 goal for the club.

After an impressive season with Hapoel Haifa, he returned to Maccabi for the 2011/12 season. 
During 2011–12 season, Vered played most of the season for Maccabi, including the historic qualification to the European League, and even scored against Dinamo Kiev.

After finishing his contract in June 2013,Vered turned into a free player in transfer market

On 11 November 2019 it was confirmed, that Vered had joined Hapoel Kfar Shalem. However, 29-year old Vered announced his retirement on 13 January 2020.

Playing style
Vered is a right-footed right back that can also play center back and left back.

Honours
Maccabi Tel Aviv
Israeli Premier League (1): 2012–13

References

External links
 at footballdatabase.eu

1990 births
Living people
Israeli Jews
Israeli footballers
Maccabi Tel Aviv F.C. players
Sektzia Ness Ziona F.C. players
Hapoel Haifa F.C. players
Bnei Yehuda Tel Aviv F.C. players
Maccabi Netanya F.C. players
Hapoel Petah Tikva F.C. players
Hapoel Ra'anana A.F.C. players
Israeli Premier League players
Liga Leumit players
Israeli people of Romanian-Jewish descent
Footballers from Tel Aviv
Association football defenders